Colin Crawford (born November 17, 1958) is an American academic and the 24th dean of the University of Louisville School of Law. Crawford will be the 16th dean of Golden Gate University School of Law, effective summer 2021.

Education
Crawford earned his Bachelor of Arts from Columbia University in 1980, a Master of Arts degree from the University of Cambridge, and a Juris Doctor from Harvard Law School.

Career
On February 18, 2021, Golden Gate University announced it had hired Crawford as the new dean of its law school.

Crawford became dean of the University of Louisville School of Law on January 1, 2018. He was named Dean after a search that lasted nearly five years. 

Prior to his position in Louisville, he was the Robert C. Cudd Professor of Environmental Law at Tulane University Law School in New Orleans, Louisiana from 2010 to 2017. He has also taught at Georgia State University College of Law from 2003 to 2010, Thomas Jefferson School of Law from 1997 to 2003, and Brooklyn Law School from 1992 to 1997.

References

1958 births
Living people
People from Louisville, Kentucky
University of Louisville faculty
Georgia State University faculty
Golden Gate University faculty
Brooklyn Law School faculty
People from Denver
Thomas Jefferson School of Law people
Columbia College (New York) alumni
Alumni of the University of Cambridge
Harvard Law School alumni